Nangpai Gosum (also known as 'Jasamba') is a mountain in the Himalayas. Its official Nepali name is 'Pasang Lhamu', after the first Sherpani to summit Everest.

It lies on the border between Nepal and China. The total elevation of the mountain is 24,114'.The first ascent to the summit was a Japanese expedition on October 12, 1986.

Peaks
Nangpai Gosum has 3 peaks:

Nangpai Gosum I - north, the highest - 7351 m,
Nangpai Gosum II - middle - 7296 m,
Nangpai Gosum III - south - 7240 m

References

Mountains of Tibet
Mountains of Koshi Province
Seven-thousanders of the Himalayas